Mary Alice Faid (21 January 1897 – 14 January 1990), was a British writer of children's books, mostly religious fiction, and of adult fiction.

Personal life

Mary Alice Faid was born in Greenock, Scotland, in 1897. Her father was a butcher. She may have attended the University of Glasgow. She married Alexander Carson Dunn in 1923 in the Primitive Methodist Church; he was a teacher. She died in Helensburgh, Scotland, in 1990.

Faid is best known for the Trudy series of ten books for children. These take the eponymous heroine from school age to adult life, with an emphasis on her involvement with the evangelistic movement and urban missions. As well as Faid's prolific output of romantic novels, she also wrote stories for women's magazines.

Selected books

Trudy series
 Trudy Takes Charge (Pickering & Inglis, 1949)
 Trudy's Island Holiday (Pickering & Inglis, 1950)
 Trudy's Uphill Road (Pickering & Inglis, 1951)
 Trudy's College Days (Pickering & Inglis, 1953)
 School Ma'am Trudy (Pickering & Inglis, 1955)
  Trudy on Her Own (Pickering & Inglis, 1957)
  Trudy's Small Corner (Pickering & Inglis, 1959)
 Trudy Married (Pickering & Inglis, 1961)
 Trudy in Demand (Pickering & Inglis, 1964)
 Trudy and Family (Pickering & Inglis, 1970)

Adult romance fiction
 Dear Dominie (Hurst & Blackett, 1954)
 A Bride for the Laird (Hurst & Blackett, 1955)
 Stairway to Happiness (Hurst & Blackett, 1955)
 Dance to your Shadow (Hurst & Blackett, 1956)
 The Singing Rain (Hurst & Blackett, 1958)
 Rodrick's Isle (Hurst & Blackett, 1959)
 Mrs. Drummond's Daughters (Hurst & Blackett, 1960)
 Daffodil Square (Hurst & Blackett, 1962)
 Love Will Venture In (Hurst & Blackett, 1963)
 The Glass Keepsake (Hurst & Blackett, 1965)
 The Walls of Rossa (Hurst & Blackett, 1967)
 The Rowan in the Rock (Hurst & Blackett, 1969)
 The Other Side of the Park (Hurst and Blackett, 1972)
 First Love, Second Love (Hurst and Blackett, 1974)
 The Daughter at Home (Hale, 1977)
 The Marshalls of Croma (Hale, 1977)
 No Stars so Bright (Hale, 1978)
 A Kiss for the Teacher (Hale, 1979)
 The Summer of the Wedding (Hale, 1980)
 Love's Ebbing Tide (Hale, 1983)

References

See also

1897 births
1990 deaths
British children's writers
Scottish children's writers
Women romantic fiction writers
20th-century British women writers
20th-century Scottish women writers
People from Greenock
People from Helensburgh